Lockheed Martin UK Limited (LMUK) is a wholly owned subsidiary of Lockheed Martin, headquartered in London. The company was created on 1 July 1999, combining all of Lockheed Martin's UK operations into one company.

Divisions
Below is a list of LMUK's businesses and selected activities

Aeronautics
C-130J Hercules
JSF
Distribution Technologies
Integrated Systems
UK Ground Based Air Defence (GBAD)
Merlin HM Mk.1 – Prime contractor and systems integrator for the Merlin helicopter
Merlin Capability Sustainment Plus – Mid-Life Update of Merlin
Integrated Systems & Solutions
Turrets for Ajax and Warrior
Integrated Transport Systems
Missiles & Fire Control
GBAD
Javelin
Longbow attack radar and weapon system for WAH-64 Apache
Global Training and Logistics
Technology Services
Atomic Weapons Establishment
Transportation and Security Solutions
Space Systems
Trident missile
Information Technology
NATS – Air Traffic Management Systems
Ministry of Justice – Service Integration & Management (SIAM)

References

External links
 LMUK website

Aerospace companies of England
Technology companies established in 1999
British companies established in 1999
British subsidiaries of foreign companies
1999 establishments in England
Companies based in London